Cast a Deadly Spell (1991) is a horror fantasy detective television film with Fred Ward, Julianne Moore, David Warner and Clancy Brown. It was directed by Martin Campbell, produced by Gale Anne Hurd, and written by Joseph Dougherty. The original music score was composed by Curt Sobel.

Cast a Deadly Spell combines two genres – eldritch tales of H. P. Lovecraft's Cthulhu Mythos, and film noir mysteries.

Plot Summary
In an alternate 1948 Los Angeles, mythical creatures and monsters are real, zombies are used as a labor class, and magic is just as commonplace as the latest technology, used for everything from lighting cigarettes to murder. Hardboiled private detective Harry Philip Lovecraft is unique, a person who actively chooses not to use magic because he believes it keeps his conscience clean.

A man named Mickey delivers a large grimoire to nightclub owner and mobster Harry Bordon in return for a sizeable payment. Mickey seems nervous, and after he leaves it is revealed why: the book is blank. Bordon orders his lieutenant, Tugwell, to follow Mickey. Mickey heads for Union Station, where he intends to meet with his girlfriend, Lilly Sirwar. However, Mickey spots Tugwell and tells Lilly to flee before being cornered by Tugwell in a restroom. Tugwell animates the trimmed sheets of newspaper that Mickey believed to be cash, and murders him with thousands of papercuts while Lilly retrieves a large package from a station locker.

Meanwhile, Lovecraft is contacted by the wealthy and eccentric Amos Hackshaw to recover the actual book, the Necronomicon, which was stolen from his collection by his former chauffeur, Larry Willis. Willis was fired after Hackshaw believed he was attempting to corrupt his 16-year-old daughter, Olivia, who he has raised alone ever since he became a widower. Hackshaw asks Lovecraft to locate the book before a conference that starts at midnight two nights from then. Before departing the Hackshaw estate, Lovecraft meets Olivia, an avid hunter of unicorns and worshipper of Diana. Olivia has been sheltered and repressed all her life and as a result exhibits inappropriate behavior, including sexual aggression, which Lovecraft spurns. As Lovecraft leaves, Hackshaw sends a gargoyle familiar to observe the investigation.

While investigating the flophouse where Willis had been living, Lovecraft recovers a trio of clues: a souvenir photo of Mickey & Lilly taken at Harry Bordon’s Dunwich Club, a sample of perfume, and a note on a housing development's stationery reading "Union Station - One Bag". Lovecraft then heads to the Dunwich Club, where he encounters Connie Stone, an old flame who is now in a relationship with Bordon, with whom Lovecraft once had some association. Lovecraft asks around about Mickey before being summoned to speak to Bordon. Bordon tries to convince Lovecraft to join his organization, which Lovecraft rejects before questioning Bordon about the Necronomicon. When he leaves, Tugwell and his zombie henchman follow shortly after. At his office, it is revealed that Lovecraft and Bordon were former partners on the LA County police force before Bordon became corrupt.

The next morning, Lovecraft wakes to find Olivia in his office, apologizing for her behavior the previous day. Lovecraft takes her out to breakfast, and Tugwell pays the diner manager to deliver a slip containing cursed runes to Lovecraft. Lovecraft recognizes the incantation and confronts the manager, resulting in a fight that’s interrupted when a demon emerges and kills the manager, who was holding the slip at that moment. Lovecraft and the diner's cook trap the demon in a freezer before he and Olivia head to the police station to give statements about the incident. While there, Detective Otto Grimaldi and Olivia display an obvious attraction.

Lovecraft & Olivia are released with the help of his landlady, Hypolite Kropotkin, and her cousin, attorney Thadius Pilgrim. Lovecraft mentions the Necronomicon, and Mrs. Kropotkin shows immediate worry, declaring it to be the key to ending the world, quoting the Book of Revelation. Lovecraft returns Olivia home, where he updates Hackshaw on the status of the case. When he leaves the Hackshaw estate, he realizes he is being followed and discovers Grimaldi had been ordered to tail him. Lovecraft, who has grown concerned for Olivia's well-bring, asks Grimaldi to watch her instead.

That night, Lovecraft returns to his office/apartment to find Connie waiting for him. They spend the night together, and the next morning she tells Lovecraft what she knows about Mickey & Lilly and identifies the perfume sample. After Connie leaves, Lovecraft talks to Mrs. Kropotkin, who gives him a protective charm despite his protests and warns him that the rituals in the Necronomicon can backfire against the caster. Olivia discovers Grimaldi spying on her when she accidentally injures him while hunting, and takes him into the mansion so she can see to him.

Lovecraft goes to Vista Bonita, the housing development on the stationery he found in Willis’ rented room. Mickey is revealed to be Michael J. Locksteader, the president of the real estate company building the community. He learns that Lilly has been posing to others as Mickey's sister, and is staying at the Hotel Ashcroft. Lovecraft enlists Connie’s help to lure Lilly to meet. At the hotel, Lovecraft realizes that Lilly is the drag persona of Larry Willis, who started a relationship with Mickey Locksteader after they met at a party.

After Lovecraft agrees to help Willis flee to Tijuana, Willis reveals that Bordon is the actual money behind Vista Bonita through a series of shell corporations. Mickey recruited Willis on Bordon's behalf to infiltrate the Hackshaw home and find out why Hackshaw wanted to purchase the development at substantially above market value. Willis discovered the Necronomicon and stole it on Bordon's orders, along with the blank fake that Bordon received, which had been commissioned for insurance purposes. Willis & Mickey intended to ransom the real book back to Hackshaw to get money to flee Los Angeles together, because Hackshaw & Bordon plan to unleash the Great Old Ones using the book, and will sacrifice Olivia as part of the ritual because she is a virgin.

Hackshaw's gargoyle arrives, destroying the hotel room and killing Willis. Lovecraft & Connie flee to her apartment with the Necronomicon, only to discover Bordon and Tugwell waiting. Bordon reveals that Connie has doublecrossed Lovecraft, kills Tugwell for murdering Mickey before he could lead them to the book, and takes possession of the real copy. Bordon, Connie, and the zombie henchman take Lovecraft captive and go to Vista Bonita, where they meet Hackshaw, who has Olivia bound and gagged in preparation for the ritual. Bordon reveals he and Hackshaw have been in partnership, with Bordon becoming ruler of the new world while Hackshaw believes he will ascend to godhood. Connie kills Bordon, declaring she has no intention to be subservient to him, but Hackshaw takes control of the zombie henchman before Connie can shoot Lovecraft as well, who Hackshaw wants to witness the summoning. Using the book and its incantations, Hackshaw successfully summons an eldritch horror in the center of Vista Bonita. However, the creature rejects Olivia as a sacrifice and devours Hackshaw instead, despite Lovecraft’s attempt to save the villain. The ritual having failed, the monster sinks back into the earth and returns through its portal.

As a result of Hackshaw's death, the gargoyle familiar vanishes and the zombie expires. When Olivia regains consciousness, she tells Lovecraft that Grimaldi is in Hackshaw's car, and Lovecraft realizes what has happened: Olivia successfully seduced a married Grimaldi, who took her virginity, leaving her unusable as a sacrifice. Lovecraft tells Connie she will have to be taken into custody for killing Bordon, but they still share a kiss before she is arrested. Lovecraft returns to his office with the book in his possession, confident his aversion to magic will override any temptation to use the book and that the world will be safe as a result.

Critical reception 
In The New York Times John J. O'Connor said, "... Cast a Deadly Spell, a new HBO Pictures production that can be seen tonight at 8 on the pay-cable service, gives the city a spin that should make even its most jaded observers sit up, chuckle and wince.... Mining familiar formulas, Mr. Dougherty's Cast a Deadly Spell is engagingly different and special."

In the Chicago Tribune Rick Kogan said, "I've had some very strange times in Los Angeles, spotted some very strange people. But none of what I've done or seen in that town can compare with what happens to H. Phillip Lovecraft in a special effects-filled and wildly successful original Home Box Office movie called Cast a Deadly Spell... Casting its own spell, this movie invigorates."

Sequel 
HBO produced a sequel, Witch Hunt, with Dennis Hopper playing Lovecraft in place of  Ward. Witch Hunt takes place in the 1950s during the Second Red Scare, with magic substituted for communism.  Many characters reappear from Cast a Deadly Spell, although some have different backstories.

Cast 
Fred Ward – Harry Philip Lovecraft (same initials as Howard Phillips Lovecraft)
Julianne Moore – Connie Stone
David Warner – Amos Hackshaw
Alexandra Powers – Olivia Hackshaw
Clancy Brown – Harry Bordon
Charles Hallahan – Detective Morris Bradbury
Arnetia Walker – Hypolite Kropotkin
Raymond O'Connor – Tugwell
Peter Allas – Detective Otto Grimaldi
Ken Thorley - Mickey Locksteader
Lee Tergesen – Larry Willis/Lilly Sirwar
Michael Reid MacKay – Gargoyle
Curt Sobel – Band Leader

Awards 
Emmy Award - Outstanding Music & Lyrics (Won)
Emmy Award - Outstanding Sound Editing (Nomination)
Saturn Award - Best Genre Television Series (Nomination)
CableACE Award - Best Original Score (Nomination)

References

External links 

 
 
 

1991 films
American supernatural comedy films
American satirical films
American detective films
American urban fantasy films
American neo-noir films
American supernatural horror films
1990s English-language films
Films set in 1948
Films set in Los Angeles
Cthulhu Mythos films
HBO Films films
Films directed by Martin Campbell
1991 comedy films
1990s American films